E.M.A.S, (i.e. "gold", but also as a stylism for "Edaran Muzik Aspirasi Semasa"), is the tenth studio album from Malaysian pop singer-songwriter Siti Nurhaliza. The album was released on 3 March 2003 in Malaysia, Singapore and Brunei and at a later time in Indonesia. This album also includes a mini-VCD that features a video message from Siti and 2 video clips of "Bukan Cinta Biasa" and "Ku Milikmu".

Another notable singles include "Debaran Cinta" & "Sebenar Cinta". E.M.A.S has been the most successful album in Siti's career as a singer. The album has sold over 300,000 copies in Indonesia. The album received quite a number of prestigious awards.

In addition to Siti's career, she wrote the lyrics for five songs on the album.

The album has been nominated for the Best Album Cover, won Best Vocal Performance in an Album (Female), Best Musical Arrangement in a Song ("Bukan Cinta Biasa"), Best Pop Album and Best Album at the Anugerah Industri Muzik in 2004.

Production
Siti Nurhaliza telling about the inspiration for E.M.A.S:

{{quote|"E.M.A.S (Edaran Muzik Aspirasi Semasa) was produced based on my observation on the contemporary music releases. Each day [and] each year, taste [in music] is changing and I have too find suitable ideas so that each album that I release can be accepted by all."}}

The album was her second album to be produced by Aubrey Suwito after Safa (2001), with Tan Su Loke as the executive producer. Other producers include Helen Yap, Zulkefli Majid, Aidit Alfian, Azmeer, Zuraini, Julfekar, Ajai & Wong. Siti also contributed lyrics for five songs.

Reception and critical response
To promote the launch and release of E.M.A.S in Indonesia, Siti embarked on a 6-day promotional tour including being invited as guests for well-known Indonesian television shows. E.M.A.S met positive reviews from Malaysian music critics. Zul Husni of Berita Harian reviewed the album as a proof of Siti's maturity after more than 8 years in the music industry. A reviewer for Harian Metro praised Siti for maintaining her standard in giving her best when singing any songs. In a favourable review by Jad Mahidin of Sunday Mail, he gave the album a four-star rating. He said the album was "enjoyable" from start to finish and praised her "impressive vocal work throughout the album". Suzan Ahmad of Berita Minggu'' also echoed Jad's opinion in praising Siti's vocals in the album.

Track listing

Awards

2003

2004

Explanatory notes

References

External links

2003 albums
Siti Nurhaliza albums
Suria Records albums
Malay-language albums
Siti Nurhaliza video albums